Grantshouse railway station served the village of Grantshouse, Berwickshire, Scotland from 1846 to 1964 on the East Coast Main Line.

History 
The station opened as Grant's House on 22 June 1846 by the North British Railway. The goods yard was to the west which had a goods shed. The station's name was changed to Grantshouse in 1915. The signal box opened in 1918. The station closed to passengers on 4 May 1964 and closed to goods on 28 December 1964.

References 

Former North British Railway stations
Disused railway stations in the Scottish Borders
Railway stations in Great Britain opened in 1846
Railway stations in Great Britain closed in 1964
1846 establishments in Scotland
1964 disestablishments in Scotland
Beeching closures in Scotland